Fırat Çelik (born March 25, 1981) is a Turkish-German actor.

Biography 
He was born in Ostfildern, Germany. He is the son of Alevi-Zaza immigrants from Tunceli, who returned to Turkey when he was two. When Fırat was 9, his family emigrated to France. The Çelik family settled in the suburbs of Champigny-sur-Marne. At 19 he started being male model and make advertising in such activity.

He took drama classes supported by its close. Fırat at that time was not quite sure what career to choose, but that changed when he met director Thierry Harcourt. Harcourt, believed in the capabilities of Çelik and decided to train as an actor.

Filmography

Televisión

Movies

References

External links 
 

1981 births
Living people
German people of Turkish descent
21st-century Turkish male actors
Turkish male film actors
Turkish male television actors
 Kurdish Alevis